Co-modality is a notion introduced by the European Commission in 2006 in the field of the transport policy to define an approach of the globality of the transport modes and of their combinations.

Description 
For the European Commission co-modality refers to a "use of different modes on their own and in combination" in the aim to obtain "an optimal and sustainable utilisation of resources".

This notion introduces a new approach to the European transport policy in which one do not seek, like in the 2001 white paper, to oppose transport modes one to another, i.e. opposing roads to its alternatives, but rather to find an optimum exploiting the domains of relevance of the various transport modes and of their combinations.

Controversy 
The transition from the support of intermodality and multimodality as exposed in the 2001 white paper to the notion of co-modality has been seen by many observers of the sector of transport as the sign of the abandonment of a policy oriented towards the development of the alternatives to the road mode.

See also
Cycle lane

References

External links 
 White paper European transport policy for 2010 : time to decide
 Mid-term review of the 2001 Transport White Paper Keep Europe Moving
Opinion of the Committee of the Regions on the mid-term review of the European Commission's 2001 transport white paper

Transportation planning
Intermodal transport